Nitro blue tetrazolium is a chemical compound composed of two tetrazole moieties. It is used in immunology for sensitive detection of alkaline phosphatase (with BCIP). NBT serves as the oxidant and BCIP is the AP-substrate (and gives also dark blue dye).

Clinical significance
In immunohistochemistry the alkaline phosphatase is often used as a marker, conjugated to an antibody. The colored product can either be of the NBT/BCIP reaction reveals where the antibody is bound, or can be used in immunofluorescence.

The NBT/BCIP reaction is also used for colorimetric/spectrophotometric activity assays of oxidoreductases. One application is in activity stains in gel electrophoresis, such as with the mitochondrial electron transport chain complexes.

Nitro blue tetrazolium is used in a diagnostic test, particularly for chronic granulomatous disease and other diseases of phagocyte function. When there is an NADPH oxidase defect, the phagocyte is unable to make reactive oxygen species or radicals required for bacterial killing. As a result, bacteria may thrive within the phagocyte. The higher the blue score, the better the cell is at producing reactive oxygen species.

References

Nitrobenzenes
Tetrazoles
Phenol ethers
Immunologic tests